Dead Ringers is a comedy impressions radio and TV show broadcast on BBC Radio 4 and later BBC Two.

Radio series

Series 1 (2000)
The first series starred Alistair McGowan, Jon Culshaw, Simon Lipson, Kate Robbins (episodes 1–2) and Jan Ravens (episodes 3–4).
The producers were Bill Dare, Danny Wallace and Mario Stylianides.

Series 2 (2000)
The second series saw Jon Culshaw and Jan Ravens joined by Kevin Connelly, Phil Cornwell (except episodes 6–7) and Mark Perry (episodes 5–8). Adam Bromley joined as associate producer alongside producer Bill Dare. Episode 8 was the first to have Jon Culshaw read the closing credits in his now traditional Tom Baker voice.

Series 3 (2000)
The third series starred Jon Culshaw, Jan Ravens, Mark Perry, Lewis MacLeod (episode 1), Phil Cornwell (episodes 2–3) and Kevin Connelly (episodes 4–5). The producer was Bill Dare and associate producer was Adam Bromley (episode 3 only).

Special (2001)
The special was aired as part of The Archers 50th anniversary celebrations on Radio 4. It starred Jon Culshaw, Jan Ravens, Mark Perry and Kevin Connelly. Jeremy Pascall served as The Archers consultant and the producer was Bill Dare.

Series 4 (2001)
The fourth series starred Jon Culshaw, Jan Ravens, Mark Perry, Kevin Connelly (except episode 3) and Phil Cornwell (episode 3). Mario Stylianides returned as producer with Bill Dare being credited as the programmes deviser.

Special (2001)
This special marked the 2001 general election. It starred Jon Culshaw, Jan Ravens, Mark Perry and Kevin Connelly. The programme was devised by Bill Dare and the producer was Mario Stylianides.

Series 5 (2001)
The fifth series starred Jon Culshaw, Jan Ravens, Mark Perry, Kevin Connelly and Matthew Cox (episode 3). Bill Dare returned as producer. Episode 1 was recorded at the Edinburgh Festival Fringe. The recording of the fourth and final episode of this series, due to be broadcast on 14 September 2001, was cancelled, following the September 11 attacks.

Series 6 (2001-02)
The sixth series starred Jon Culshaw, Jan Ravens, Mark Perry, Kevin Connelly and Phil Cornwell (episodes 3–5). Mario Stylianides returned as producer with Bill Dare again credited as the programmes deviser.

Series 7 (2002)
The seventh series starred Jon Culshaw, Jan Ravens, Mark Perry, Kevin Connelly, Phil Cornwell (episode 3) and Stefano Paolini (episode 4). The producers were Mario Stylianides (episodes 1–3) and Bill Dare (episode 4). On episodes 1-3 Bill Dare was credited as the programmes deviser.

Special (2002)
This special marked the Golden Jubilee of Elizabeth II.

Series 8 (2002)
The eighth series starred Jon Culshaw, Jan Ravens, Mark Perry, Phil Cornwell (episodes 2–4) and Brian Bowles (episode 1). The producer was Bill Dare. Episodes 1 and 2 were recorded at the Edinburgh Festival Fringe.

Series 9 (2003)
The ninth series starred Jon Culshaw, Jan Ravens, Mark Perry, Kevin Connelly and Phil Cornwell. The programme was devised by Bill Dare and the producer was Katie Tyrrell.

Series 10 (2003)
The tenth series starred Jon Culshaw, Jan Ravens, Mark Perry, Phil Cornwell and Kevin Connelly (except episode 3). The programme was devised by Bill Dare and the producer was Mario Stylianides. Episode 5 was entitled the 50th edition of Dead Ringers, however this was inaccurate because the fourth episode of Series 5 never aired, meaning this was the 49th episode overall.

Special (2004)
Recorded in The Pleasance theatre at the Edinburgh Festival Fringe.

Series 11 (2005)
For this series the show went on tour around England & Wales recording at Assembly Hall Theatre, Tunbridge Wells, Warwick Arts Centre, New Theatre, Cardiff, Hull City Hall, The Anvil, Basingstoke and The Rex, Berkhamsted.

Special (2007)
The special marked the end of Tony Blair's premiership after ten years. It was commissioned after he announced his resignation on 10 May 2007 and aired five days later. The special was also the final episode of Dead Ringers for seven years, until it returned in 2014.

Series 12 (2014)
After a seven-year break Dead Ringers returned to Radio 4 for a twelfth series. Jon Culshaw and Jan Ravens returned joined by Debra Stephenson (except episode 5), Duncan Wisbey and Lewis MacLeod. Jan Ravens did not appear in episodes 3–4. Bill Dare returned as the programmes producer.

Series 13 (2014-15)
The thirteenth series starred Jon Culshaw, Jan Ravens, Debra Stephenson, Duncan Wisbey and Lewis MacLeod (episode 2). It was produced by Bill Dare.

Series 14 (2015)
The fourteenth series starred Jon Culshaw, Jan Ravens, Debra Stephenson, Duncan Wisbey and Lewis MacLeod. It was produced and created by Bill Dare.

Series 15 (2015)
The fifteenth series starred Jon Culshaw, Jan Ravens, Debra Stephenson, Duncan Wisbey and Lewis MacLeod. It was produced and created by Bill Dare. Episode 2 was recorded at the Edinburgh Festival Fringe.

Specials (2015-16)
The 2015-16 specials starred Jon Culshaw, Jan Ravens, Debra Stephenson, Duncan Wisbey and Lewis MacLeod. It was produced and created by Bill Dare. The theme tune was altered to include sleigh bells.

Series 16 (2016)
The sixteenth series starred Jon Culshaw, Jan Ravens, Debra Stephenson (except episode 5), Duncan Wisbey (except episodes 5–6) and Lewis MacLeod (except episode 4). It was produced and created by Bill Dare.

Specials (2016)
Starring Jon Culshaw, Jan Ravens, Debra Stephenson, Duncan Wisbey and Lewis MacLeod. It was produced and created by Bill Dare.

Series 17 (2017)
The seventeenth series starred Jon Culshaw, Jan Ravens, Debra Stephenson, Duncan Wisbey and Lewis MacLeod. It was produced and created by Bill Dare.

Specials (2017)
The 2017 specials starred Jon Culshaw, Jan Ravens, Debra Stephenson, Duncan Wisbey and Lewis MacLeod. It was produced and created by Bill Dare.

Special (2018)
This special guest starred Sanjeev Bhaskar as an extraterrestrial called Geoff. It was 45 minutes long instead of the usual 30.

Series 18 (2018)
The eighteenth series starred Jon Culshaw, Jan Ravens, Debra Stephenson, Duncan Wisbey (except episode 5), Lewis MacLeod (except episode 5) and Josh Berry (episodes 5–6). It was produced and created by Bill Dare. Episode 2 was recorded at the Craft of Comedy UK Festival Fringe in the Venue Cymru, Llandudno.

Specials (2018)
The 2018 specials starred Jon Culshaw, Jan Ravens, Debra Stephenson (except special #2), Duncan Wisbey and Lewis MacLeod. It was produced and created by Bill Dare.

Compilations (2001-02)

The Best of Dead Ringers (2004)

TV series

Pilot (2002)

Series 1 (2002)

Series 2 (2003)

Specials (2003-04)

Series 3 (2004)

Series 4 (2004)

Series 5 (2005)

Specials (2005)

Series 6 (2006)

Series 7 (2007)

References

Dead Ringers
Dead Ringers